The University of Saint Mary (USM) is a private Catholic university in Leavenworth, Kansas, United States. It is sponsored by the Sisters of Charity of Leavenworth, who established it in 1923 as Saint Mary College. Though it was originally a school for women, the school is now coeducational.   The mother house of the order is also on the premises.  At one time the nuns' property had its own post office, Xavier, Kansas, the name honoring St. Francis Xavier.

The university offers 26 bachelor's degree programs and six master's degree programs. Traditional, evening, degree completion, and online classes are available.

History
The Sisters of Charity of Saint Vincent de Paul came to Leavenworth, Kansas, in 1858 and began teaching boys and girls.  One year later, they created St. Mary's Institute, a small educational institute for women, in downtown Leavenworth. In 1870, Saint Mary's was moved to its current location south of the City, and was renamed St. Mary's Academy. In 1923, the Sisters established Saint Mary College. In 1932, the college became a four-year institute and started accepting a few men in certain areas of study. Arthur Morton Murphy, PhD, who was born in Electric Peak, Montana and earned his doctorate at the Catholic University of America in Washington, DC, was chosen as the school's first president, and served in that capacity for 25 years. He was the first layman to preside over a Catholic college for women in the United States. Murphy was succeeded as president by poet and educator Sister Mary Janet McGilley, PhD, SCL. In 1974, Saint Mary College became the first four-year institution to offer a degree completion in Kansas City. The school became residentially coeducational in 1988. In 2000, a campus was opened in Overland Park, Kansas. The institution expanded again in July 2003, changing its name to the University of Saint Mary. The school's first fully endowed chair was inaugurated in 1989, honoring the retirement of Sister Mary Janet.

Campuses
It is near a nature preserve and has stately academic buildings, indoor athletic facilities, and outdoor playing fields.

The Overland Park Campus is in Overland Park, Kansas, on College Boulevard, near Roe Avenue and off of I435. This campus hosts evening master's degree classes and degree-completion programs. Its main function is accelerated degree completion and graduate programs and it is home to various resource centers.

The Wyandotte County Campus is located inside Providence Medical Center. It hosts master's degree classrooms and degree completion programs year round.

Saint Mary's offers Masters in Art education at Sacred Heart in Shawnee, Kansas, and has an online degree program given in eight-week sessions. Some of the buildings on these campuses are Annunciation Chapel, Saint Mary Hall, Xavier Courtyard, DePaul Library, McGilley Fieldhouse, Kehoe Memorial Baseball Field, Charles J. Berkel Memorial Stadium and the Ryan Sports Center.

Organization and administration
The university is sponsored by the Sisters of Charity of Leavenworth.

Academics
Saint Mary has around 1,200 students enrolled across two campuses. It has a full-time faculty of 31, who teach 26 undergraduate programs and six masters programs. The school has been named a "Best Value College" by the Princeton Review. Students at St. Mary come from 33 different states, and it has international students from Brazil, Trinidad and Tobago, Taiwan, the United Kingdom, Colombia, Finland and Canada.  The average age of residential full-time students is 22 and the average full-time undergraduate is 27. The student body is 47% male and 53% female. On average, USM receives 427 applications per year, and 233 students are accepted.

Student life
"Into the Streets" is a program for incoming freshmen.  The freshmen are separated into groups and are assigned different tasks such as mentoring younger students during the first day of middle school, working on houses for people in the community, helping with maintenance at the local shelter, and helping the Red Cross. St. Mary's has the alternative where students are able to do charitable activities on spring and winter breaks. Students go to Denver, Colorado, during their winter break for the opportunity to work with three different organizations, the Mount Saint Vincent Home, Annunciation School, and the Humanitarian Center for Workers. During spring break students travel to Guatemala where they help at the community center. They have the choice to travel to Appalachia where they build new homes. USM has local service agency programs where students are able to take what they learn in the classroom and use it in the real world. Members of the productions and operations management class has helped Alliance Against Family Violence improve operations by creating a computerized inventory agency. Consumer behavior and marketing research classes helped the Leavenworth community library with strategic planning, including planning a new library layout and solving other problems.

Athletics

The Saint Mary (USM) athletic teams are called the Spires. The university is a member of the National Association of Intercollegiate Athletics (NAIA), primarily competing in the Kansas Collegiate Athletic Conference (KCAC) since the 1999–2000 academic year. The Spires previously competed in the defunct Midlands Collegiate Athletic Conference (MCAC) from 1994–95 to 1998–99. Their team colors are navy and gold.

USM competes in 26 intercollegiate varsity sports: Men's sports include baseball, basketball, bowling, cross country, football, lacrosse, soccer, swimming, tennis, track & field and wrestling; while women's sports include basketball, bowling, cross country, flag football, lacrosse, soccer, softball, swimming, tennis, track & field, volleyball and wrestling; and co-ed sports include cheerleading, dance and eSports.

Facilities
Saint Mary has four sports facilities. The Ryan Sports center is a 1,500 seat multi-purpose arena which hosts the women's volleyball and men's & women's basketball games. It has an indoor track, training room, racquetball courts, and athletic offices. The McGilley's field house north of Ryan sports center is the main facility for practice and training and is home for intramural sports on campus. It has the campus weight lifting facility. The USM fitness center is used by both students and faculty. USM has separate baseball, soccer, and football fields used by both men and women.

Track & field/cross country
The University of Saint Mary cross country and track & field teams have won 21 KCAC conference championships since the inception of the program in 2011–2012. The Spires have an active streak going while winning nine straight KCAC men's cross country conference championships from 2013–2021. The Spires are led by head cross country and track & field coach Alstin Benton.

Notable people
Faculty
 Scott Frear, college football coach
 Lance Hinson, college football coach

References

External links

 
 Saint Mary athletics website

 
Educational institutions established in 1859
Education in Leavenworth County, Kansas
Buildings and structures in Leavenworth, Kansas
Catholic universities and colleges in Kansas
Roman Catholic Archdiocese of Kansas City in Kansas
1859 establishments in Kansas Territory